The Boston Bypass Independents were elected to Boston Borough Council at the 2007 local elections. The party campaigned on a wide range of issues but principally on the more vigorous promotion of a bypass for the town of Boston, Lincolnshire.

The party contested all 32 seats, winning 25 to become the first party to take overall control of the council since the borough was formed in 1974. By autumn 2008, the party had 18 borough councillors remaining, after losing four members in defections to the Better Boston Group, one to become an independent, and two in by-elections. Following the 2011 local elections, the party was almost wiped out completely.

In July 2009, the Audit Commission said, in an assessment covering the period from 2004 to 2009, that the council gave poor value for money for taxpayers. That period included 3 years of the previous administration's term of office and only 2 under the BBI. The most recent report from the Audit Commission, in February 2010, judged Boston as a 'fair' Council.

In 2008, leader Richard Austin helped found a county-wide party, "Lincolnshire Independents – Lincolnshire First!".

In 2012, the party was renamed as the Boston District Independents.

Formation

The Boston Bypass Independent Party was formed in September 2006. The bypass issue had already generated two campaign groups, the Boston & District Bypass Pressure Group (BBPG) and the Boston Bypass & Economic Growth Pressure Group (BBEG), and the BBI hoped to give this campaign a political element. Additionally the party hoped to re-invigorate local politics in the town which were perceived to have stagnated with several councillors elected unopposed.

The BBI group were partly inspired by the success of the Kidderminster Hospital Campaign, which won 16 of the seats on Wyre Forest District Council in 2004.

Electoral performance

Boston Borough Council elections, 2007

The party's slogan for the 2007 local elections was "Getting Boston Moving". Boston had no opposition group as all the Conservative, Labour, Liberal Democrat and independent councillors were represented in a joint administration, meaning that public discontent over traffic congestion was directed at all the existing councillors. The Boston Bypass Independents won the election in a landslide victory with 25 seats, the first party to take overall control since the borough was formed in 1972. All the Labour and Liberal Democrat councillors lost their seats, with only five Conservatives and two Independents elected.

2008 by-elections
One councillor stood down in June 2008 when he was convicted of drink driving. The party lost the subsequent by-election in Coastal ward on 25 July 2008 to the Conservative candidate.

Another by-election in Fenside ward on 13 November 2008 saw the party lose another seat to the British National Party, on a 22% turnout.

2009 County Council election

In the Lincolnshire County Council election on 4 June 2009, party leader Richard Austin lost his Boston South seat to the Conservative candidates, but Ray Newell took the Boston West seat from Labour.

Boston Borough Council elections, 2011

In May 2011 the BBI were defeated by the Conservatives with 14 of the remaining 18 Boston Bypass Independents losing their seats.

Name change
In August 2011, the name of the party was changed from the BBI to the Boston District Independents "to shake off its image as the ‘bypass party’".

Finances
According to its Electoral Commission records, the party had income of £6,639 (including £460 subscriptions), and expenditure of £6,248, for the year 2007, in which it contested the local council elections.  In the year 2006, it had an income of £656, and an expenditure of £340.

Better Boston Group
The Better Boston Group is a political group that split from the Boston Bypass Independents in October 2007 under the leadership Cllr Anne Dorrian. She had unsuccessfully stood for leadership of the BBI group after their landslide victory in April 2007. It has four councillors on Boston Borough Council. Cllr Brian Rush, the other unsuccessful candidate for Party leadership in April 2007, of the group said of the Boston Bypass Independents that "We came in on a typhoon and we are nothing more than a gentle breeze now. It appears to me that we haven't done anything yet. There is nothing that I can put my hand on and say the BBI have thought of that, the inspiration was there and they have carried it through." The group criticised the record of the BBI, including their approval of the Lincolnshire County Council Transport Strategy for Boston. A deal with the county council was struck to aid the BBI with the bypass proposal if they agreed not to stand in the next county council elections, prompting two councillors to resign. The chairman of the Boston Bypass Pressure Group also called on Cllr Austin and his deputy, Cllr Peter Jordan to resign over the deal with Lincolnshire Council. Both Cllrs Austin and Jordan vigorously denied any such deal and there were four BBI candidates in the subsequent County Council elections in 2009.

References

External links
Boston Bypass Independents blog

Political parties established in 2006
Locally based political parties in England
Politics of Lincolnshire
2006 establishments in England
Boston, Lincolnshire